Ian Cook may refer to:

 Ian Cook (artist) (born 1983), English artist
 Ian Cook (footballer) (1924–1989), Scottish footballer
 Ian Cook (geographer), professor of geography at the University of Exeter
 Ian Cook (psychiatrist) (born 1960), physician-researcher at UCLA
 Ian M. Cook, British businessman
 Ian Cook (racing driver) in 1967 Tasman Series

See also
 Iain Cook (born 1974), guitarist
 Ian Cooke (disambiguation)